The 1977–78 NBA season was the Bucks' tenth season in the NBA. The Bucks had drafted Marques Johnson from UCLA in the 1977 NBA Draft.

Draft picks

Roster

Regular season

Season standings

z – clinched division title
y – clinched division title
x – clinched playoff spot

Record vs. opponents

Game log

|-style="background:#bbffbb;"
| 1 || October 18, 1977 || Los Angeles
| W 117–112
|
|
|
| MECCA Arena
| 1–0
|-style="background:#fcc;"
| 2 || October 19, 1977 || @ Denver
| L 115–133
|
|
|
| McNichols Sports Arena
| 1—1
|-style="background:#bbffbb;"
| 3 || October 22, 1977 || Chicago
| W 113–95
|
|
|
| MECCA Arena
| 2–1
|-style="background:#fcc;"
| 4 || October 27, 1977 || @ Houston
| L 110–133
|
|
|
| The Summit
| 2—2
|-style="background:#bbffbb;"
| 5 || October 30, 1977 || Seattle
| W 108–95
|
|
|
| MECCA Arena
| 3–2

|-style="background:#bbffbb;"
| 6 || November 1, 1977 || Kansas City
| W 115–95
|
|
|
| MECCA Arena
| 4–2
|-style="background:#fcc;"
| 7 || November 3, 1977 || @ Cleveland
| L 91—100
|
|
|
| Coliseum at Richfield
| 4–3
|-style="background:#bbffbb;"
| 8 || November 4, 1977 || Houston
| W 110–108
|
|
|
| MECCA Arena
| 5–3
|-style="background:#fcc;"
| 9 || November 8, 1977 || Denver
| L 101–111
|
|
|
| MECCA Arena
| 5–4
|-style="background:#fcc;"
| 11 || November 11, 1977 || Cleveland
| L 82–88
|
|
|
| MECCA Arena
| 6–5

|-style="background:#bbffbb;"
| 24 || December 4, 1977 || New Jersey
| W 134–118 OT
|
|
|
| MECCA Arena
| 13–11

|-style="background:#bbffbb;"
| 42 || January 10, 1978 || Indiana
| W 125–103
|
|
|
| MECCA Arena
| 25–19
|-style="background:#bbffbb;"
| 48 || January 22, 1978 || Chicago
| W 112–90
|
|
|
| MECCA Arena
| 26–22

|-style="background:#bbffbb;"
| 57 || February 15, 1978 || New Orleans
| W 112–99
|
|
|
| MECCA Arena
| 29–28

Playoffs

|- align="center" bgcolor="#ccffcc"
| 1
| April 11
| @ Phoenix
| W 111–103
| Brian Winters (31)
| Marques Johnson (16)
| Quinn Buckner (8)
| Arizona Veterans Memorial Coliseum12,161
| 1–0
|- align="center" bgcolor="#ccffcc"
| 2
| April 14
| Phoenix
| W 94–90
| Marques Johnson (33)
| Dave Meyers (14)
| Quinn Buckner (10)
| MECCA Arena10,938
| 2–0
|-

|- align="center" bgcolor="#ffcccc"
| 1
| April 18
| @ Denver
| L 103–119
| Alex English (26)
| Dave Meyers (15)
| Brian Winters (11)
| McNichols Sports Arena17,297
| 0–1
|- align="center" bgcolor="#ffcccc"
| 2
| April 21
| @ Denver
| L 111–127
| Marques Johnson (22)
| Johnson, Meyers (5)
| Lloyd Walton (8)
| McNichols Sports Arena17,838
| 0–2
|- align="center" bgcolor="#ccffcc"
| 3
| April 23
| Denver
| W 143–112
| Marques Johnson (35)
| Marques Johnson (10)
| Lloyd Walton (11)
| MECCA Arena10,938
| 1–2
|- align="center" bgcolor="#ffcccc"
| 4
| April 25
| Denver
| L 104–118
| Johnson, Winters (14)
| Marques Johnson (7)
| Brian Winters (6)
| MECCA Arena10,938
| 1–3
|- align="center" bgcolor="#ccffcc"
| 5
| April 28
| @ Denver
| W 117–112
| Marques Johnson (34)
| Marques Johnson (17)
| Winters, Buckner (9)
| McNichols Sports Arena17,838
| 2–3
|- align="center" bgcolor="#ccffcc"
| 6
| April 30
| Denver
| W 119–91
| Alex English (21)
| Marques Johnson (17)
| Marques Johnson (9)
| MECCA Arena10,938
| 3–3
|- align="center" bgcolor="#ffcccc"
| 7
| May 3
| @ Denver
| L 110–116
| Brian Winters (27)
| Marques Johnson (16)
| Quinn Buckner (10)
| McNichols Sports Arena17,838
| 3–4
|-

Player statistics

Season

Playoffs

Awards and records
Quinn Buckner, NBA All-Defensive Second Team
Marques Johnson, NBA All-Rookie Team 1st Team
On Friday, November 25, 1977, the day after Thanksgiving, and on the road, the Bucks overcame the largest 4th quarter deficit in NBA history, defeating the Atlanta Hawks after being down by 29 points with only 8:43 left in the game.  Atlanta led 111–82 before Milwaukee went on a 35–4 run to win 117–115 in regulation.  This record was set without the use of the three-point field goal, since its NBA inception was not until the 1979–80 season.

Transactions

Trades

Free Agents

References

Milwaukee Bucks seasons
Milwaukee
Milwau
Milwau